In mathematics, Pappus's centroid theorem (also known as  the Guldinus theorem, Pappus–Guldinus theorem or Pappus's theorem) is either of two related theorems dealing with the surface areas and volumes of surfaces and solids of revolution.

The theorems are attributed to Pappus of Alexandria and Paul Guldin. Pappus's statement of this theorem appears in print for the first time in 1659, but it was known before, by Kepler in 1615 and by Guldin in 1640.

The first theorem
The first theorem states that the surface area A of a surface of revolution generated by rotating a plane curve C about an axis external to C and on the same plane is equal to the product of the arc length s of C and the distance d traveled by the geometric centroid of C:

 

For example, the surface area of the torus with minor radius r and major radius R is

Proof

A curve given by the positive function  is bounded by two points given by:

 and 

If  is an infinitesimal line element tangent to the curve, the length of the curve is given by:

The  component of the centroid of this curve is:

The area of the surface generated by rotating the curve around the x-axis is given by:

Using the last two equations to eliminate the integral we have:

The second theorem
The second theorem states that the volume V of a solid of revolution generated by rotating a plane figure F about an external axis is equal to the product of the area A of F and the distance d traveled by the geometric centroid of F. (The centroid of F is usually different from the centroid of its boundary curve C.) That is:

 

For example, the volume of the torus with minor radius r and major radius R is

 

This special case was derived by Johannes Kepler using infinitesimals.

Proof 1

The area bounded by the two functions:

 where 

 where 

and bounded by the two lines:

 and 

is given by:

The  component of the centroid of this area is given by:

If this area is rotated about the y-axis, the volume generated can be calculated using the shell method. It is given by:

Using the last two equations to eliminate the integral we have:

Proof 2
Suppose  starts in the -plane and rotates around the -axis.

and the theorem states that

where  is the determinant of the Jacobian matrix of the change of variables. 

Expanding,

 

Now,

by change of variables.

Generalizations

The theorems can be generalized for arbitrary curves and shapes, under appropriate conditions. 

Goodman & Goodman generalize the second theorem as follows. If the figure F moves through space so that it remains perpendicular to the curve L traced by the centroid of F, then it sweeps out a solid of volume V = Ad, where A is the area of F and d is the length of L. (This assumes the solid does not intersect itself.) In particular, F may rotate about its centroid during the motion. 

However, the corresponding generalization of the first theorem is only true if the curve L traced by the centroid lies in a plane perpendicular to the plane of C.

In n-dimensions 
In general, one can generate an  dimensional solid by rotating an  dimensional solid  around a  dimensional sphere. This is called an -solid of revolution of species . Let the -th centroid of  be defined by 

Then Pappus' theorems generalize to:

Volume of -solid of revolution of species  
  =  (Volume of generating -solid)  (Surface area of -sphere traced by the -th centroid of the generating solid) 

and

Surface area of -solid of revolution of species 
  = (Surface area of generating -solid)  (Surface area of -sphere traced by the -th centroid of the generating solid) 

Footnotes

References

External links

Theorems in calculus
Geometric centers
Theorems in geometry
Area
Volume